Alveolus (pl. alveoli, adj. alveolar) is a general anatomical term for a concave cavity or pit.

Uses in anatomy and zoology
 Pulmonary alveolus, an air sac in the lungs
 Alveolar cell or pneumocyte
 Alveolar duct
 Alveolar macrophage
 Mammary alveolus, a milk sac in the mammary glands
 Alveolar gland
 Dental alveolus, also known as "tooth socket", a socket in the jaw that holds the roots of teeth
 Alveolar ridge, the jaw structure that contains the dental alveoli
 Alveolar canals
 Alveolar process
 Arteries:
 Superior alveolar artery (disambiguation)
 Anterior superior alveolar arteries
 Posterior superior alveolar artery
 Inferior alveolar artery
 Nerves:
 Anterior superior alveolar nerve
 Middle superior alveolar nerve
 Inferior alveolar nerve

Uses in botany, microbiology and related disciplines
 Surface cavities or pits, such as on the stem of Myrmecodia species
 Pits on honeycombed surfaces such as receptacles of many angiosperms
 Pits on the fruiting bodies of fungi such as Boletus or the ascocarps of fungi such as typical ascomycetes
 Pits on the valves of the tests of many diatoms
 Membrane supporting vesicles of the alveolates

Uses in linguistics
 Alveolar consonant, a linguistic vocalization depending upon touching tongue to alveolar ridge
 Alveolar stop

See also

 Alveolar soft part sarcoma, a very rare type of soft-tissue sarcoma,
 Acinus, considered by some (but not all) sources to be synonymous with Alveolus

Human anatomy
Animal anatomy